Jordan Sinclair (born 11 July 1996) is a Scottish professional footballer who plays for Berwick Rangers, as a midfielder.

Career
He began his career with Hibernian, leaving the club at the end of the 2015–16 season. He then played for Livingston, and Brechin City.

He moved to Edinburgh City in June 2019, and to Berwick Rangers in June 2020.

Career statistics

References

1996 births
Living people
Scottish footballers
Hibernian F.C. players
Livingston F.C. players
Brechin City F.C. players
F.C. Edinburgh players
Berwick Rangers F.C. players
Scottish Professional Football League players
Association football midfielders